Kuwait Finance House (KFH) was established in the State of Kuwait, in 1977, as the first bank operating in accordance with the Islamic Shari'a rulings. KFH is listed in Kuwait Stock Exchange (KSE), with a market capitalization of $8.2 billion (KWD 2.49 billion) as of May 2016. Assets total $55.52 billion (KWD 16.83 billion) and deposits amount to $34.97 billion (KWD 10.66 billion.)

History
Kuwait Finance House was established in 1977 as Kuwait's first Islamic bank. It received 170 applications to open new accounts on its first day of operation on 31 August 1978. KFH opened in temporary headquarters on Ahmad Al-Jaber Street, before moving to the Emad Commercial Center in 1983 and then its present-day location on Abdullah Al-Mubarek Street in 1986. By 1983, KFH was the only Islamic Bank listed on the Banker's list of the top 100 Arab Banks. In 1984, KFH was listed on the Kuwait Stock Exchange. In 1989, KFH's subsidiary in Turkey, Kuveyt Turk Participation Bank, was established by a Turkish cabinet decree.

KFH Capital Investment Company was formed in 1999 to invest in the public equity, private equity, and real estate markets across the globe.  KFH Capital is the main investment of the bank, with offices in Safat, Kuwait and Oman.

In 2002, KFH opened its first branch in Bahrain and in 2005 KFH Malaysia was established, becoming the first Islamic bank to be granted a license in the county under the 1983 Islamic Banking Act. Since then, KFH and Kuveyt Turk have established a presence in the Kingdom of Saudi Arabia, Jordan, the UAE and Germany.

In July 2017, KFH studied a merger with Ahli United Bank., and in July 2022 KFH sealed the merger of Ahli United Bank.

Activities 
KFH provides Islamic Shari'a compliant products and services, covering banking, real estate, trade finance, investment portfolios, and other products and services.

Since the 1980s, KFH has witnessed multi-activity in international expansion. It has established independent banks in Turkey, Bahrain, and Malaysia. Moreover, it has stakes in other Islamic banks. Its investment activities in the US, Europe, South East Asia and the Middle East contributed to achieving the growing profit of KFH.

KFH is a major player in the international sukuk market, the volume of which for KFH trading group reached US$11.4 billion in 2016.

According to the KFH website, until January 2017, KFH ran the following subsidiaries:
 Kuwait: KFH Capital, Development Enterprises Holding Co., Aref Investment Group (Closed), Kuwait Finance House Investment Company, Emmaa Real Estate Company Ksc (Closed), Kuwait Finance House Real Estate Company, International Integrated Computer Systems Group Co., Human Investment for Training and Consulting, Public Services Company, ALAFCO Aviation Lease And Finance Company Kscc, Al Salam Hospital Company Ksc (Closed)
 Bahrain: Kuwait Finance House – Kingdom Of Bahrain, Bahrain Pearl Company, INMAA House Real Estate Company, Mena Telecom Company, Miracle Graphics Company, Sevilla Village Company, Diyar Al Moharaq Company, B K Development Company, Baitak Oasis Industrial Company, Kuwait Finance House- Hashemite Kingdom Of Jordan, Diyar Homes Company
 Saudi Arabia: Saudi Kuwaiti Finance House, "Baitak" Real Estate Company (KSA), Takhteet and Namaa Real Estate Company (GYO)
 Turkey: Kuwait Turkish Participation Bank "Kuwait Turk", Corviztatel Company, Corviz Company (GYO)
 Malaysia: Kuwait Finance House, Baitak Asset Management Company, Baitak Libwan Company, Baitak Nominees Company

Investment in associates
First Takaful Insurance Company K.S.C. (Closed) - Kuwait
Gulf Investment House K.S.C. (Closed) - Kuwait
Liquidity Management Centre Company B.S.C. (Closed) - Bahrain
Sharjah Islamic Bank - United Arab Emirates
A’ayan Leasing & Investment Company K.S.C. (Closed) - Kuwait
Munshaat Real Estate Projects Company K.S.C. (Closed) - Kuwait
 Sukuk Real Estate Development Company K.S.C. (Closed) - Kuwait

Ownership 
This is the ownership structure after the merger of Kuwait Finance House with Ahli United Bank:

 16.80% - Kuwait Investment Authority 
 9.19% - Kuwait Public Institution for Social Security Fund
 7.32% - Kuwait Public Authority of Minor Affairs
 5.09% - Kuwait Awqaf Public Foundation
 3.08% - Bahrian Social Insurance Organization
 1.71% - Tamdeen Investment Co.
 1.67% - Sheikh Salem Sabah Al Naser AlSabah

Key People 
 Hamad Abdulmohsen Al-Marzook - Chairman
 Mazin Al Nahedh - Former CEO
 Abdulwahab Iesa Alrushood - Acting CEO
 Bader Abdul Mohsen Al Mukhaizeem - Former Chairman

Awards
 Straight Through Processing (STP) award 2016 from Citi Bank
 Best Islamic Project Finance Provider 2016 from Global Finance
 Best Islamic Financial Institution in GCC 2016 from Global Finance
Best Bank in Kuwait 2015 from EMEA Finance
 Best Islamic Bank in Kuwait 2015 from EMEA Finance
 Best Islamic Bank in Kuwait 2015 from Islamic Finance News Magazine
 Europe Best Digital Participation Bank KFH Turkey from Global Finance

References

External links
 Official website

Banks of Kuwait
Banks established in 1977
Companies based in Kuwait City
Kuwaiti companies established in 1977
Companies listed on the Boursa Kuwait